Mark Stanley (born November 7, 1968) is an American musician, songwriter, and record producer based in Maryland, USA. A multi-instrumentalist, composer and producer, his primary instrument is guitar, on which he touches a wide mix of styles, including jazz, psychedelia, post-punk, art rock, avant-pop, and avant progressive rock. 

Stanley has been working with members of The Muffins since his first recording, "Disconcerto" by Chainsaw Jazz (1993). 
He has performed live with The Muffins, 9353, Chainsaw Jazz, Clutch, Kristeen Young, Spookey Ruben, and Troy Van Leeuwen (Queens of the Stone Age, Perfect Circle, Failure).
Stanley was a founding member of the band Handsome (band) with Peter Mengede (Helmet). He is the songwriter, vocalist and guitarist for the band Spy Machines (Jean Paul Gaster, Mike Dillon, and Hank Upton) and co-fronts the band Farquhar with Mark Smoot. He has recorded under the pseudonyms Johnny Foodstamps, Pig Manikin, and Levitating Pam.

Education
Stanley studied at Berklee College of Music before graduating from NYU with a degree in Jazz Studies.
His private teachers include Wayne Krantz, Hal Galper, Bruce Arnold, Charlie Banacos and Paul Bollenback.

Family
Mark Stanley is the 1st cousin once removed of Owsley Stanley, the great grandson of Augustus Owsley Stanley, great great-grandson of Pierce Crosby, and Otto Hilgard Tittmann  and is the great great-grandnephew of William Owsley.

Discography 
Stanley has released eighteen recordings as a bandleader:

"Pig Street" (1994)
"Look, Honey" (1996) 
"Weird Horizon" (1998) 
"Living Machine" (2000)
"Insect Warriors" (2002) featuring Dennis Chambers, Mark Egan and Sean Rickman
"Blueberry Submarines" (2002) 
"Humans" (2004) 
"9 Volt" (2004) 
 "Gift Ideas For The Universe" (2005)
"Taste The Magic" (2006)
"Oceanic Fields" (2013)
 "Dark Brain" (2014) featuring Oz Noy, Jean-Paul Gaster (Clutch), Peter Fraize and Scott Ambush (Spyro Gyra), 
"NYANDERTHAL" (2016)
"Double Dreaming" (2018) Mark Stanley with Carla Diratz
"WHAT?" (2020) Mark Stanley
"Speed Limits of Iceland" (2021)
"This Idiot's Dream" (2021)
"Trash Lawyer" (2021)

Farquhar
His band Farquhar has made three records distributed by Cuneiform Records

"Farquhar" (1999) 
"Meadow Full Of Serpents" (2005)
"Dreamshit" (2012)

Love and Rockets
"Lift" (1998) Lift (Love and Rockets album)

Spookey Ruben
"Bed and Breakfast" (2001) Bed and Breakfast (album)

Clutch
"Pitchfork" (1991) Pitchfork (album)

Spy Machines
"Spy Machines" (2020)

References

External links
 

Psychedelic musicians
Progressive rock musicians
Jazz-rock guitarists
American jazz guitarists
1968 births
Experimental composers
Cuneiform Records artists
Living people
20th-century American guitarists